Jesús Cañizares Sánchez (born 21 April 1992), best known as Cañi, is a Spanish footballer who plays for Silva SD as an attacking midfielder.

Club career
Born in As Pontes, Cañi was a youth product of local CD As Pontes. He made his debuts as a senior in 2011–12 season, representing the side in Tercera División. On 21 May 2013 he signed a two-year deal with Deportivo de La Coruña, being initially assigned to the reserves also in the fourth level.

Cañi made his official debut for the Galicians' first team on 12 September 2013, starting in a 2–2 away draw against Córdoba CF, for the season's Copa del Rey.

References

External links
 
 

1992 births
Living people
Spanish footballers
Association football midfielders
Segunda División players
Tercera División players
Deportivo Fabril players
Deportivo de La Coruña players
Footballers from As Pontes de García Rodríguez